Madhya Pradesh State Highway 5 (MP SH 5)  is a state highway running from Gaurihar town near MP - UP border until Ganjdewra via Chandla, Bachhon, Rajnagar, Khajuraho, Bameetha 

The highway connects towns in North-Eastern Madhya Pradesh. Khajuraho is an important town for tourism.

See also
List of state highways in Madhya Pradesh

References

State Highways in Madhya Pradesh